Anatoliy Romanovych Franchuk (8 September 1935 – 7 July 2021) was a Ukrainian politician.

Biography
Franchuk graduated from the Krasnoyarsk State Technical University in 1961 and the Academy of National Economy in 1980. After serving in the Soviet Army and holding various engineering jobs within the USSR, he became Minister of Economy of the Republic of Crimea from 1991 to 1993. In 1994 the Ukrainian President Leonid Kuchma, a family friend, appointed him as Prime Minister of Crimea against the elected separatist President of Crimea, Yuriy Meshkov.  He eventually exercised power in Crimea in 1995 after the Ukrainian National Guard forcibly expelled Meshkov from Crimea.  He served until 1996 and again served from 1997 to 1998. 

As a member of the Revival party, he served in the Verkhovna Rada from 1995 to 2006. Notably, his son, was married to Olena Pinchuk, the daughter of former President Leonid Kuchma.

Anatoliy Franchuk died on 7 July 2021 at the age of 85.

Awards
Order of Lenin
Order of the October Revolution
Order of the Red Banner of Labour
USSR State Prize

References

1935 births
2021 deaths
Prime Ministers of Crimea
Second convocation members of the Verkhovna Rada
Third convocation members of the Verkhovna Rada
Fourth convocation members of the Verkhovna Rada
Revival (Ukraine) politicians
People from Vinnytsia Oblast
Russian Presidential Academy of National Economy and Public Administration alumni
Recipients of the Order of Lenin
Recipients of the Order of the Red Banner of Labour
Recipients of the USSR State Prize